Jack Todd may refer to:

 John (Jack) Todd (1911–2007), Northern Irish mathematician and pioneer in the field of numerical analysis
 Jack Todd (journalist) (born 1946), sports columnist for the Montreal Gazette
 Jack Todd (footballer, born 1881) (1881–1962), Australian rules footballer for Carlton 
 Jack Todd (footballer, born 1879) (1879–1960), Australian rules footballer for St Kilda and South Melbourne

See also 
 John Todd (disambiguation)